Timothy John Raphael (26 September 192920 November 2016) was an Anglican priest.

Raphael was educated at Christ's College, Christchurch and the University of Leeds. after which he was a Scientific Officer at RAE Bedford. He trained for ordination at the College of the Resurrection, Mirfield and was ordained deacon in 1955 and priest in 1956. He was a curate at St Stephen, Westminster from 1955 to 1960. He was Vicar of St Mary's Church, Welling from 1960 to 1963; Rector from 1963 to 1965 of St Michael and All Angels, Christchurch, New Zealand; Dean of Dunedin from 1965 to 1973; Vicar of St John's Wood, London from 1973 to 1983; and Archdeacon of Middlesex from 1983 to 1996.

References

1929 births
People educated at Christ's College, Christchurch
Alumni of the University of Leeds
Deans of Dunedin
Archdeacons of Middlesex
2016 deaths